Bagwell may refer to:

People named Bagwell
Buff Bagwell (b. 1970), US actor and professional wrestler
Jeff Bagwell (b. 1968), US baseball player
John Philip Bagwell (1874–1946), Irish politician and railroad manager
Philip Bagwell (1914–2006), British historian and academic
Richard Bagwell (1848–1918), Irish historian and academic
Shaune Bagwell (b. 1974), US model and film actress
Wendy Bagwell (1925–1996), US Southern gospel singer
William Bagwell (politician) (1776–1826), Irish political figure

Places
Bagwell, Texas, an unincorporated community in the Red River County of US state of Texas
Bagwell Field, the football facility of East Carolina University in the US state of North Carolina

Other
United Mine Workers of America v. Bagwell, United States Supreme Court case
Theodore "T-Bag" Bagwell, a fictional character on US television series Prison Break
Bagwell College of Education, the Educational College of Kennesaw State University in US state of Georgia